Thomas Hart Dyke (11 December 1801 – 25 June 1866) was an English first-class cricketer associated with Marylebone Cricket Club and Kent who was active in the 1820s. He is recorded in two matches from 1824 to 1827, totalling 6 runs with a highest score of 6.

Dyke belonged to a cricketing family and was a relative of barrister Herbert Jenner.

References

English cricketers
English cricketers of 1787 to 1825
Marylebone Cricket Club cricketers
1801 births
1866 deaths
Kent cricketers